Dorothy Lightbourne is the former Minister of Justice and the Attorney General of Jamaica from September 2007 to July 2011 when she was removed by Prime Minister Bruce Golding and replaced by Delroy Chuck as Minister of Justice and by Ransford Braham as Attorney General. She also served as the Leader of Government Business or Majority Leader of the Senate from September 2007 to July 2011.

She was born in Aeolus Valley, St Thomas, and raised as an Anglican. She attended Addey and Stanhope School and Hull University. She is a member of the Jamaica Labour Party. She was a Senator in 1984–1989 and was Deputy President of the Senate

Senator Lightbourne has come under many criticisms in light of her handling of the Manatt, Phelps & Phillips/Christopher 'Dudus' Coke extradition scandal. She has also come under a lot of public criticism for allegedly lying in the Commission of Enquiry as it relates to the Mannat/Dudus scandal and her rocky relationship with Senator K. D. Knight

Following her dismissal; she has withdrawn from public life and, politically, the roles of Minister of Justice and Attorney General – normally held by the same person – were split. 

She is a Commander of the Order of Distinction (CD) and a member of the King's Counsel (KC).

See also
 Women in the House of Representatives of Jamaica

References

External links
Profile of Cabinet Ministers Retrieved 26 December 2008

Living people
1938 births
Government ministers of Jamaica
Members of the Senate of Jamaica
Members of the House of Representatives of Jamaica
Jamaica Labour Party politicians
Jamaican Anglicans
People from Saint Thomas Parish, Jamaica
People educated at Addey and Stanhope School
Attorneys General of Jamaica
Jamaican Queen's Counsel
Women government ministers of Jamaica
Female justice ministers
Justice ministers of Jamaica
21st-century Jamaican women politicians
21st-century Jamaican politicians
20th-century Jamaican women politicians
20th-century Jamaican politicians
Commanders of the Order of Distinction